Michael John Lewis  is a British archaeologist and Head of the Portable Antiquities Scheme.

Career
Lewis studied at the University of Surrey (Roehampton) and the University of York before researching his PhD at the University of Kent, completed in 2004. He is the current head of the Portable Antiquities Scheme. Lewis is a research associate at the University of York and a visiting professor at the University of Reading.

Between 2012 and 2017 Lewis was a special constable with the Metropolitan Police Art & Antiques Unit.

He was elected as a Fellow of the Society of Antiquaries of London on 4 April 2006. He is Freeman of the Worshipful Company of Art Scholars and an adviser to the All Party Parliamentary Archaeology Group.

Select publications
with P. Deckers & S. Thomas. 2016. Aspects of Non-Professional Metal Detecting in Europe. Open Archaeology. 
with N. Speakman 2016. Los Pilares de Europa: la edad media en el British Museum. British Museum/ObraSocial la Caixa. 
2014. Saints and their Badges: saints’ lives and medieval pilgrim badge. Greenlight publishing.
with G. Owen-Crocker & D. Terkla. 2011. New Research on the Bayeux Tapestry: proceedings of aconference at the British Museum. Oxbow. 
 with G. Egan, K. Leahy, J. Naylor & S. Worrell. 2010. A Decade of Discovery: proceedings of the Portable Antiquities Scheme Conference 2007. British Archaeological Reports
 2008.. The Real World of the Bayeux Tapestry. The History Press.

References

Living people
Year of birth missing (living people)
Place of birth missing (living people)
Fellows of the Society of Antiquaries of London
British archaeologists
21st-century archaeologists
People associated with the Portable Antiquities Scheme